Hampstead Heath railway station is in the London Borough of Camden in north London on the North London Line, between  and  stations, and is in Travelcard Zone 2. Since 11 November 2007 it and the service there have been run by London Overground.

History
In the nineteenth century up to 100,000 people per day used the station at weekends and on public holidays as the Heath was a popular leisure destination for Londoners. The station was rebuilt, after Second World War bomb damage, and in the 1990s in conjunction with works to allow Eurostar trains to use the North London Line.

Design
The platform canopies are in a pseudo-antique style which is in stark contrast to the poured concrete style of the rest of the station's structural features. The line runs below street level with access via staircases to each platform. Lifts providing access to both platforms were added in 2014. During the same refurbishment works new ticket barriers were added.

Artwork 
In 2011, Evenings' Hill by British artist Clare Woods was installed along the length of the platform, made from porcelain tiles. The artwork was commissioned by TfL in 2011, as part of London Overground's art programme.

Connections
London Buses routes 24, 46, 168, 268 and C11 serve the station.

Services
The typical service at the station in trains per hour is:
 4 westbound to Richmond via 
 2 westbound to Clapham Junction also via Willesden Junction
 6 eastbound to Stratford via 

No direct trains run to/from Clapham Junction in the very late evening. The last westbound service terminates at Willesden Junction Low Level (and the first eastbound of the day starts from there).

References

External links

 Excel file displaying National Rail station usage information for 2005/06 

Railway stations in the London Borough of Camden
Former London and North Western Railway stations
Railway stations in Great Britain opened in 1860
Railway stations served by London Overground
Buildings and structures in Hampstead